The Twentieth Century Encyclopedia of Catholicism is a series of 150 volumes examining topics pertaining to Catholicism, many of them originally published in France. It was published in English in the United States by Hawthorn Books from 1958 to 1971.  The series editor was Henri Daniel-Rops.  The series was divided into 16 sections.  In the United States, volumes were published individually over a number of years and made available for sale separately.

Background Information

General
The Twentieth Century Encyclopedia of Catholicism was intended to cover every aspect of the Catholic faith. Most of the authors occupied major posts in Catholic universities. Because most of the participating authors were European, the books were translated into English under the supervision of Lancelot Sheppard. The resulting works were approved by separate editorial boards in the United States and England. The individual books were also reviewed by officials of the Catholic Church, who granted the Church's imprimatur to each volume.

This series of books was originally planned to comprise 150 volumes organized into 15 sections encompassing general topics such as belief, faith, the nature of man, the Bible, etc. However, when completed, the series consisted of 16 sections; this was accomplished by reducing the size of the planned section covering Catholicism and the Arts from 13 volumes to 6 volumes, and creating an additional section for Catholicism and Science that consisted of 8 volumes.  Ultimately the series consisted of 148 works of scholarship, as well as a "double-sized" index that was assigned two volume numbers.

The contemporary reaction to The Twentieth Century Encyclopedia of Catholicism was quite favorable. Besides the Catholic press and academics praising the series, the secular Saturday Review proclaimed it, "An enterprise of great scope in the intellectual and spiritual life of contemporary Catholicism." The series was awarded the Thomas More Association Medal "for the most distinguished contribution to Catholic publishing in 1958."

Publication

Hawthorn Books made an announcement in January 1958 that it was preparing to publish a new Catholic encyclopedia. The firm advised that it was planning on releasing the English language version of a French Catholic encyclopedia currently being published; at that time, 40 volumes of the French version were already in print. Instead of using the large folio format typically used in encyclopedias, the individual volumes were published in the much smaller octavo format, each about 125-150 pages in length. Each volume, while germane to the topic of its section, was meant to be self-contained with its own citations and bibliography.

The production was intended to be an international effort: with the books published in the U.S. by Hawthorn Books, in Canada by McClelland & Stewart Ltd, in Great Britain by Burnes Oates and Washbourne, in France by Librairie Arthème Fayard, and in Germany by Paul Pattlock Verlag. However, it is unknown if the publishing ventures besides those in the United States and France occurred.

The books within the series were planned to be published over a period of 75 months. Subscribers could purchase them at a rate of two-books-a-month for $5.00. If purchased individually, the books were sold for $3.50 each. The order in which the volumes were published did not coincide with the volume numbers within the series; for example, the first book published, What is the Bible?, was actually assigned volume #60 within the structure of the encyclopedia.

Publication of The Twentieth Century Encyclopedia of Catholicism started in September 1958 and by December 1964, 128 of the volumes had been published. However, production of the series took longer than planned and not all of the initially projected books were published. The final volume, the index, was not published until 1971. Also, while most of the volumes of the encyclopedia (94 by September 1962) were published before the beginning of the Second Vatican Council, some were published after the conclusion of that ecumenical council and reflect its influence.

Senior Editorial Team
All four of the men that formed the senior editorial team were well-established Catholic authors, academics, and editors.
 Henri Daniel-Rops, Editor-in-Chief
 Lancelot C. Sheppard, English Supervising Editor
 Brother Celestine Luke, F.S.C., S.T.D., American Consulting Editor and Chief of Consultants
 Joseph W. Sprug, Editor of the Index

Organization of the Encyclopedia 
The Twentieth Century Encyclopedia of Catholicism was divided into sixteen sections, each of which was intended to explore a topic within the Catholic faith more deeply. The table below lists the sections and their topics.

Section I. Knowledge and Faith

Section II. The Basic Truths

Section III. The Nature of Man

Section IV. The Means of Redemption

Section V. The Life of Faith

Section VI. The Word of God

Section VII. The History of the Church

Section VIII. The Organization of the Church

Section IX. The Church and the Modern World

Section X. The Worship of the Church

Section XI. Catholicism and Literature

Section XII. Catholicism and the Arts

Section XIII. Catholicism and Science

Section XIV. Outside the Church

Section XV. Non-Christian Beliefs

Section XVI. General and Supplementary Volumes

References

External references
 20th century encyclopedia of Catholicism

Christian encyclopedias